Qosabeh (or Qassabeh; also Qəsəbə in Azerbaijani) is a city in Qosabeh District of Meshgin Shahr County, Ardabil province, Iran. At the 2006 census, its population was 2,110 in 488 households, when it was then a village in Meshgin-e Gharbi Rural District of the Central District. The following census in 2011 counted 2,152 people in 592 households. The latest census in 2016 showed a population of 2,095 people in 662 households, by which time Qosabeh had become the only city within the district of the same name.

References 

Meshgin Shahr County

Cities in Ardabil Province

Towns and villages in Meshgin Shahr County

Populated places in Ardabil Province

Populated places in Meshgin Shahr County